Philip Smith (born 7 November 1967) is an Ulster Unionist Party (UUP) politician who was a Member of the Northern Ireland Assembly (MLA) for  Strangford from 2016 to 2017. Smith now works for Queen's University Belfast. He lost his seat in the 2017 Assembly election, being eliminated on the 9th count.

In the 2019 local elections, Smith was elected to Ards and North Down Borough Council, representing the Comber district electoral area.

Smith was the UUP candidate for Strangford during the 2019 UK general election. He came third.

In the 2022 Assembly election, Smith stood again for Strangford, but was eliminated on the 3rd count.

References

1967 births
Living people
Ulster Unionist Party MLAs
Northern Ireland MLAs 2016–2017